The women's slalom competition at the 2015 World Championships was held on Saturday, February 14. Mikaela Shiffrin successfully defended her world title in her hometown.

Results
The first run was started at 10:15 MST (UTC−7) and the second run at 14:15.

References

Women's slalom
2015 in American women's sports
FIS